Lieutenant General Dirk Verbeek is a South African Army general who spent his career in the Military Intelligence Service. He served as Chief of Staff Intelligence for the SANDF from 1994 - 1998.

Military career
In 1988, as a major general, he was appointed as the Chief Director Counter Intelligence until 1993. Chief of Staff Intelligence from 1994 - 1998.

Awards and decorations

References

South African Army generals
South African military personnel of the Border War
Year of birth missing
Possibly living people